Sweet Bird of Youth is a 1962 drama film starring Paul Newman, Geraldine Page, Shirley Knight, Madeleine Sherwood, Ed Begley, Rip Torn and Mildred Dunnock. Based on the 1959 play of the same name by Tennessee Williams, it focuses on the relationship between a drifter and a faded movie star. The film was adapted and directed by Richard Brooks.

The film won the Academy Award for Best Actor in a Supporting Role (Ed Begley), and was nominated for Best Actress in a Leading Role (Geraldine Page) and Best Actress in a Supporting Role (Shirley Knight). The film version was sanitized, with Chance becoming a drifter rather than a gigolo for hire. The ending was also heavily altered from the explicit sexual mutilation scene depicted in the conclusion of the original stage version.

Plot
Handsome, young Chance Wayne returns to his hometown of St. Cloud, Mississippi accompanied by a considerably older film star, Alexandra Del Lago. She is needy and depressed, particularly about a film she has just finished making, and speaks of retiring from the acting world forever.

Chance had gone to Hollywood to seek fame and fortune at the behest of St. Cloud's most powerful and influential citizen, "Boss" Finley, either too naive or unwilling to appreciate that Finley merely wants Chance, a waiter from the country club, to keep away from his beautiful daughter, Heavenly.

A political kingpin, Finley enjoys putting Heavenly on display as a model of purity and chastity. His ruthless son, Tom Jr., aids his father's ambitions in any way he can. He, too, is unhappy to have Chance Wayne back in town.

Desperate to have Alexandra further his fantasy of becoming a star, Chance has become her lover. He goes so far as to blackmail her with a tape recording, on which she speaks openly of a dependence on drugs. Alexandra defies him, becoming irate at the realization that Chance's romantic interests in Heavenly are more important to him than her own needs.

Just when Alexandra is at her most vulnerable, a call comes from Hollywood to notify her that the new movie she's just made appears to be a certain success, reviving her career. Meanwhile, Finley's discarded mistress, Miss Lucy, exposes Finley's underhanded tactics to the government authorities. Chance, with nowhere else to turn and still on his own two feet, persuades Heavenly to leave town with him. Able now to face the truth about himself, Chance and Heavenly reconcile and leave town together, leaving her father to face indictment.

Cast

 Paul Newman as Chance Wayne
 Geraldine Page as Alexandra Del Lago
 Shirley Knight as Heavenly Finley
 Ed Begley as Tom "Boss" Finley
 Rip Torn as Thomas "Tom" J. Finley Jr.
 Mildred Dunnock as Aunt Nonnie
 Madeleine Sherwood as Miss Lucy
 Philip Abbott as Dr. George Scudder
 Corey Allen as Scotty
 Barry Cahill as Bud
 Dub Taylor as Dan Hatcher
 James Douglas as Leroy
 Barry Atwater as Ben Jackson
 Charles Arnt as Mayor Henricks
 Kelly Thordsen as Sheriff Clark
 William Forrest as Bennie Taubman
 Roy Glenn as Charles
 Les Tremayne as Trailer Narrator (voice)

Development
The film was written for the screen and directed by Richard Brooks. The adaptation of the original play by Tennessee Williams went through several drafts, with Brooks unsure how to film the play's controversial ending in which Chance is castrated by Finley's hoods. The castration was cut from the film and replaced by Finley's son clubbing Chance in the face with a cane, followed by Chance and Heavenly escaping together.

Reception
The film was a hit, making almost $8,000,000 on a $2,000,000 budget.

The film also was one of Roger Ebert's top films of the decade, and held a score of 74% on Rotten Tomatoes based on a total of 19 surveyed critics.

Awards and nominations

See also
 List of American films of 1962

References

External links
 
 
 
 

1962 drama films
1962 films
American drama films
American films based on plays
Films based on works by Tennessee Williams
Films directed by Richard Brooks
Films featuring a Best Drama Actress Golden Globe-winning performance
Films featuring a Best Supporting Actor Academy Award-winning performance
Films set in Florida
Metro-Goldwyn-Mayer films
Southern Gothic films
1960s English-language films
1960s American films